Hockey Australia is an organisation that formed from the merger of the Australian Hockey Association and Women's Hockey Australia in 2000. It is the national body responsible for the promotion, development  and administration of field hockey in Australia. Hockey Australia is a full member of the International Hockey Federation, and comprises the State and Territory associations.

History
The British Army has been credited with the spread of hockey throughout the world, but in Australia's case, the British Navy deserves the honours. In the late 1800s, Australia did not have a naval fleet of its own and relied upon the Royal Navy for the security of the coastline. The British Naval officers stationed in Australia taught the locals the game of hockey and laid the foundations for a sport which Australians have developed and mastered.

National teams
Hockey Australia is the governing body that oversees Australia's National Teams.
The Kookaburras (Men)
The Hockeyroos (Women)
The Burras (Under 21 Men) 
The Jillaroos (Under 21 Women)
Australia women's national indoor hockey team

Tournaments
Hockey Australia organises National Tournaments, at various levels. These are as follows:
Australian Hockey League 1991–2018 (Men) 1991-2018 (Women), Replaced by Hockey One
Hockey One 2019–Present (Men & Women)
National Championships Last Run in 1993 (Women) 1994 (Men), Replaced by AHL
Under 21 National Championships
Under 18 National Championships 
Under 15 National Championships
Under 13 Australian Carnival
National Country Championships
Veterans National Championships
Under 13 Indoor National Carnival
Under 15 Indoor National Championships
Under 21 Indoor National Championships
Under 18 Indoor National Championships
Opens Indoor National Championships

In August 2015, Hockey Australia announced its Indoor Australian Championships will be held in Wollongong in 2016 and 2017. The three-week festival of indoor hockey will be played at the Illawarra Hockey Centre, in Wollongong. Championships will be played in Open, Under 15, Under 18 and the Under 21 categories, as well as a new Under 13 event, over the 23 days. This is the first time all Australian Indoor Championships are held in one venue.

Championship results

Men
The Australian Hockey League is the premier field hockey competition in Australia, it began in 1991, with its arrival the Open National Championships were discontinued.

Women

 Open National Championships were discontinued after 1994, so for the early years of the AHL there was also a National Championships.
 From 2014 onwards, the Under 18 National Championships have been contested by 10 teams, with New South Wales and Victoria each fielding 2 teams. In 2016 this number increased to 11 with the addition of a second Queensland team.
 From 2010 onwards, Hockey Australia have not played a finals series in the U15 National Championships, so the winners were the teams ranked highest on the ladder after the round-robin competition. In 2014 Hockey Australia increased the number of teams to 12 with the stronger states (NSW, QLD, VIC, WA) fielding two teams each, playoff matches were reintroduced.
 The Under 13 National Championship was included as a full National Championship from 2011. Prior to this an invitational event was run and sanctioned by Hockey Australia, but did not hold National Championship status. Similarly to the U15 competition, there is no finals series and the Champion is the team ranked highest on the ladder at the conclusion of the competition. In 2014 Hockey Australia increased the number of teams to 12 with the stronger states (NSW, QLD, VIC, WA) fielding two teams each. In 2015 Hockey Australia renamed this event as an Australian Carnival, with the stronger states (NSW, QLD, VIC, WA) required to pick even teams in order to promote participation over elitism, matches are also shortened to 20 minute halves with a full round robin.

See also
 Kookaburras – Australia men's national field hockey team
 Australia women's national field hockey team
 Australian field hockey players
 Indoor field hockey
 Indoor Hockey World Cup
 Australian Hockey League
Hockey One

References

External links
 

Australia
 
2000 establishments in Australia
Sports organizations established in 2000